Martin Elvestad (born 26 July 1989) is a Norwegian footballer currently playing for the Norwegian side Kvik Halden.

He has previously played for Fredrikstad in the Norwegian Premier League.

External links

1989 births
Living people
Norwegian footballers
Fredrikstad FK players
Eliteserien players
Kvik Halden FK players
Association football defenders